Careproctus aciculipunctatus, also called the speckled snailfish, is a species of fish in the family Liparidae (snailfish).

The specific name is from Latin acicula ("spinule") and punctatus ("dotted").

Description

The pleural ribs are absent and there is one hypural plate, without slit. Its mouth is terminal (pointed straight forward) and its teeth simple. Its body is densely echinated (bristled) with very small spinules.

Habitat

Careproctus aciculipunctatus lives in the northeast Atlantic Ocean, to the southwest of Ireland; it was first discovered off the Porcupine Bank.

References

Liparidae
Fish described in 1997
Taxa named by Anatoly Andriyashev
Taxa named by Natalia Vladimirovna Chernova